Jean Jacques Joseph André de Schonen (24 April 1869 – 8 December 1933) was an Olympic foil fencer and a pistol and Trapshooter at the 1900 summer games He also competed at the 1924 Summer Olympics in the rapid-fire pistol event.

References

External links
 

1869 births
1933 deaths
Fencers from Paris
French male foil fencers
Fencers at the 1900 Summer Olympics
French male sport shooters
Olympic fencers of France
Olympic shooters of France
Shooters at the 1900 Summer Olympics
Shooters at the 1924 Summer Olympics
Barons of France